Raritan River is a major river of New Jersey. Its watershed drains much of the mountainous area of the central part of the state, emptying into the Raritan Bay on the Atlantic Ocean.

History
Geologists assert that the lower Raritan provided the course of the mouth of the Hudson River approximately 6,000 years ago. Following the end of the last ice age, the Narrows had not yet been formed and the Hudson flowed along the Watchung Mountains to present-day Bound Brook, then followed the course of the Raritan eastward into Lower New York Bay.

The name Raritan possibly derives from a branch of the Lenape people called the Nariticongs, the first people known to settle the Raritan Valley. 

Following conflict with the arriving Dutch colonists, the native people of the region were forced to sell their territory near the Raritan Bay and move further inland along the river valley. As English colonists took over the region, they took advantage of the river's location between New York and Philadelphia as well as a road network developed by the Lenape to turn the region into a transportation and commercial hub. As a result, the Raritan River became an important waterway for colonial travel and trade, allowing for the development of trade centers like Raritan Landing and New Brunswick where agricultural and raw material goods could be sold. 

During the American Revolutionary War, the river was the site of guerilla warfare by American militiamen against British patrols, culminating in the Battle of Bound Brook where a large British force attacked an American outpost south of the river.

The success of the Erie Canal sparked a "canal fever" in the United States, catalyzing the construction of the Delaware and Raritan Canal between New Brunswick on the Raritan and Bordentown on the Delaware to provide a critical link between New York City and Philadelphia on the Delaware River. The vast majority of traffic along the canal was Pennsylvania anthracite coal with the rest consisting mostly of agricultural goods, and at its peak in 1866 it transported more cargo than the Erie Canal. In 1932 the canal shut down for commercial use, though in 1974 it was turned into a state park for recreational use and remains used as a water supply for Central New Jersey.

Description
The river forms at the confluence of the North and South Branches just west of Somerville at the border of Bridgewater, Branchburg, and Hillsborough Townships. It flows for approximately  before slowing in tidewater at New Brunswick, and its estuary extends  more entering the western end of Raritan Bay at South Amboy.

Comprehensive measures have been taken to reduce the pollution and increase the water quality. These actions have benefited the fish population which include (but are not limited to) largemouth bass, smallmouth bass, sunfish, catfish, trout, chain pickerel, american eels, carp and yellow perch. Pike can be found in relative abundance in some portions of the river like Clinton and Califon. An occasional Musky has been taken out of the Raritan as well. The tidal portions of the river host migratory salt water species such as striped bass, fluke, winter flounder, weakfish and bluefish. Recently, efforts to restore anadromous fish populations have been made, done by removing many of the obsolete dams and the constructing dam bypass infrastructure. Hopefully this will result in restoring shad, striped bass, and sturgeon populations in the river. Many nesting birds and water fowl make their homes in and along the length of the river. Crustaceans such as blue claw crab, fiddler crabs and green crabs are also found in the tidal sections of the river. Crayfish can be found farther upstream.

The river is also used for recreational boating, including use by the rowing team of Rutgers University in New Brunswick. The river is featured in the title of Rutgers' alma mater, On the Banks of the Old Raritan, and its flooding is mentioned in the song. 

Near its mouth, the river is spanned by the Raritan Bay Drawbridge, a New Jersey Transit railroad bridge which carries the North Jersey Coast Line; the Victory Bridge which carries Route 35 (connecting Perth Amboy and Sayreville, New Jersey); the Edison Bridge, which carries U.S. Route 9 (connecting Woodbridge Township and Sayreville); and the Driscoll Bridge, which carries the Garden State Parkway (connecting Woodbridge Township and Sayreville).

Water supply
The Raritan River is an important source of drinking water for the central portion of New Jersey.

The New Jersey Water Supply Authority operates two reservoirs off of the Raritan river, the Spruce Run Reservoir and Round Valley Reservoir, and controls releases of water to ensure the “minimum passing flow rates” enforced by the New Jersey Department of Environmental Protection.

Flooding
The Raritan River has persistent flooding problems when excessive rain from storms affects the river basin. The flooding problems mainly affect the town of Bound Brook, which is partially built on a natural floodplain at the junction of several tributaries, and Manville, which has a large neighborhood known as Lost Valley that lies on the floodplain between the Raritan River and its largest tributary river, which is known as the Millstone River. Other towns in the Raritan River basin also experience flooding to a lesser degree.

In August 2011, record flooding occurred once again after Hurricane Irene swept through the area. This problem was exacerbated by well-above average rainfall that fell in the weeks before the storm hit, and spurred completion of the Army Corps of Engineers flood control project. As of 2015, the current status of this project is:
 The R2 levee system is functionally complete – The R2 Levee System is designed to provide Bound Brook with protection from a 150-year flood level. The levee is built to the height of the raised Talmage Avenue Bridge.
 Closure gates along Raritan are functionally complete – The gate closures across the New Jersey Transit railroad tracks on the western side of Bound Brook and at the South Main Street railroad underpass that leads to Queens Bridge have been completed and are used to keep flood waters out of Bound Brook.
 The new Talmadge Avenue Bridge that connects Bound Brook and Bridgewater, New Jersey is functionally complete. The replacement bridge was built to the height of the R2 Levee to prevent Middle Brook and Raritan River waters from entering Bound Brook from the west.
 To improve water flow through Bound Brook, the former Conrail bridge over the Raritan River and its associated railroad embankment that were located east of Bound Brook were removed during 2007. The bridge and embankment, when they were in place, acted to block the river flow through the Bound Brook area. To build the main Bound Brook R2 levee, the bridge and embankment needed to be removed.

Gallery

Communities on the Raritan
(In alphabetical order)
 Bound Brook
 Bridgewater
 East Brunswick
 Edison
 Franklin Township
 Highland Park
 Hillsborough
 Manville
 Middlesex
 New Brunswick
 Perth Amboy
 Piscataway
 Raritan
 Sayreville
 Somerville
 South Amboy
 South Bound Brook
 Woodbridge

Tributaries
The Raritan river is formed by the confluence of:
 North Branch Raritan River
 South Branch Raritan River
Its main tributaries are:
 Green Brook
 Lawrence Brook
 Millstone River
 South River
Others are:
 Arrarat Creek
 Crows Mill Creek
 Cuckels Brook
 Dukes Brook
 Garron Creek
 Manalapan Brook
 Middle Brook
 Mile Run
 Buell Brook
 Mill Brook
 Padilla Creek
 Peters Brook
 Pine Creek
 Randolph Brook
 Red Root Creek

See also
 List of New Jersey rivers
 List of crossings of the Raritan River
 Raritan Bay
 Raritan Bayshore
 Sandy Hook Bay
 Delaware and Raritan Canal
 Delaware and Raritan Canal State Park
 Manasquan River
 Navesink River
 Passaic River
 Rahway River
 Shrewsbury River
 Arthur Kill
 Raritan River Project
 Hudson Canyon

References

External links

 Delaware & Raritan Canal State Park
 Duke Island Park
 Raritan Basin Watershed Alliance
 U.S. Geological Survey: NJ stream gaging stations
 The Raritan-Millstone Heritage Alliance
 Smallmouth bass article from the New Jersey Division of Fish Game and Wildlife

 
Rivers of Middlesex County, New Jersey
Rivers of Somerset County, New Jersey
Rivers of New Jersey
Delaware and Raritan Canal
Bodies of water in Woodbridge Township, New Jersey